Mohammed Sahraoui (born 23 February 1978) is a Tunisian boxer. He competed in the men's middleweight event at the 2004 Summer Olympics.

References

1978 births
Living people
Tunisian male boxers
Olympic boxers of Tunisia
Boxers at the 2004 Summer Olympics
Place of birth missing (living people)
Middleweight boxers